Gorisht-Kocul oil field is an Albanian oil field that was discovered in 1966. It is a big on-shore oil field in Albania. The Gorisht-Kocul oil field is located east of the city of Vlorë in southern Albania.

See also

Oil fields of Albania

References

Oil fields of Albania
Selenicë